Jiří Walker Procházka (born 18 August 1959), also known by the pseudonym George P. Walker, is a Czech sci-fi and detective fiction author. In 1989, Procházka described himself as "the permanent political prisoner" because he had lived since his birth in communist Czechoslovakia.

Career
His professional career started at the Research Institute for High Voltage Electronics (VÚSE) in Prague in 1982. He then worked for some time in a printers, during which time he wrote his first stories (around 1985). Afterwards, Procházka worked as an IT specialist, later becoming a writer and publisher. He was part of a wave of new authors that emerged from 1980 to 1990. His story Rox'n'Roll was written in 1988.  described Procházka as "a striking element in the Czech sci-fi waters" whose "highly imaginative stories became examples for a good many followers." According to Boris Hokr, Procházka was an author that opened the door to Czech sci-fi, alongside Ondřej Neff.

Books
 Ken Wood a meč krále D'Sala (Ken Wood and the Sword of the King D'Sal), Ivo Železný, Prague 1991, first part of a fantasy series published under the name of George P. Walker. New edition 2008 published by Triton Prague.
 Tvůrci času (Creators of Time), Winston Smith, Prague 1991, sci-fi anthology.
 Ken Wood a perly královny Maub (Ken Wood and the Queen Maub's Pearls), Ivo Železný, Prague 1992, second part of a fantasy series published under the name of George P. Walker.
 Hvězdní honáci (Star Cowboys), Altar, Prague 1996, sci-fi novel, galactic space-opera, awarded by the SF, Fantasy and Horror Academy Award, 
 Jablka z Beltamoru (Apples from Beltamor), Ivo Železný, Prague 2002, 63rd part of the sci-fi serie Mark Stone.
 Totální ztráta rozměru (Total Loss of Dimension), Milenium Publishing, Prague 2003, sci-fi stories collection
 Agent JFK 1 - Pašerák (Bootlegger), Triton, Prague 2005, with Miroslav Žamboch,
 Agent JFK 2 - Není krve bez ohně (Where there's blood, there's fire), Prague 2005, with Miroslav Žamboch
 Agent JFK 3 - Meč a tomahawk (Sword and Tomahawk), Triton, Prague 2006, with Miroslav Žamboch,
 Agent JFK 4 - Armády nesmrtelných (Armies of Immortals), Triton, Prague 2006, with Miroslav Žamboch
 Agent JFK 11 - Podhoubí smrti (Breeding Ground Called Death), Triton, Prague 2007,
 Agent JFK 27 - Dlouhý černý úsvit (Long Black Dawn), Triton, Prague 2012,
 Druhý krok nikam (Second Step to Nowhere), Brokilon 2011,  (free sequel to Total Loss of Dimension)
 Agent JFK 33 - Soumrak světů (Twilight of Worlds), Triton, Prague 2014, SF stories collection
 Mrtvá šelma - Souřadnice zločinu 1 (Dead Beast – Coordinates of Crime), Plus, Prague 2015, with Klára Smolíková, 
 Šest nevinných (Six Innocent), Pavel Mervart, Červený Kostelec 2015, with Josef Pecinovský, David Zábranský, Přemysl Krejčík, Jan Sviták, Lukáš Vavrečka
 Tajná dvojka A+B. Zločin mezi dinosaury  Klára Smolíková; Jiří Walker Procházka; Viktor Svoboda, Fragment, Prague 2016

Literary awards
 1992 Ludvík Souček Award
 1993 Certificate of Merit in the Karel Čapek literary contest
 1997 Science-fiction, Fantasy and Horror Academy Award
 1997 Ikaros Award
 2002 Science-fiction, Fantasy and Horror Academy Award
 2004 Science-fiction, Fantasy and Horror Academy Award
 2015 Science-fiction, Fantasy and Horror Academy Award
 2014 Grand Master of the SF genre
 2015 Aeronautilus Award

References

External links
Jiří Walker Procházka in The European Library (66 items in the period 1990–2016)

People from Kutná Hora
1959 births
Living people
20th-century Czech writers
Czech science fiction writers
Czech male writers
20th-century male writers